Joseph Dumighan (born 25 September 1938) is an English former footballer who played in the Football League as a forward for Darlington.

Dumighan was born in Quebec, County Durham. As a youngster, he played for the works team of Mackay's carpet factory in Durham before joining Sunderland. He never played for their first team, and moved on to Darlington. After four appearances and one goal in the Fourth Division, he moved on to Horden Colliery Welfare and South Shields of the North Eastern League.

Dumighan played cricket at County League level, and retained an involvement with football as a scout for Leeds, then Darlington then for 20 years at Sunderland retiring during 2016.

References

1938 births
Living people
People from County Durham (district)
Footballers from County Durham
English footballers
Association football forwards
Sunderland A.F.C. players
Darlington F.C. players
Darlington Town F.C. players
South Shields F.C. (1936) players
English Football League players